The government of Argentina,  within the framework of a federal system, is a presidential representative democratic republic. The President of Argentina is both head of state and head of government. Executive power is exercised by the President. Legislative power is vested in the National Congress. The Judiciary is independent from the Executive and from the Legislature, and is vested in the Supreme Court and the lower national tribunals.

Executive Branch

The current composition of the Executive Branch includes only the Head of State and President, formally given the power over the Administration to follow through with the interests of the Nation. The President is also the Chief of the Argentine Armed Forces.

The President and the Vice President are elected through universal suffrage by the nation considered as a whole. The Constitutional reform of 1994 introduced a two-round system by which the winning President-Vice President ticket has to receive either more than 45% of the overall valid votes, or at least 40% of it and a 10% lead over the runner-up. In any other case, the two leading tickets get to face a second round whose victor will be decided by a simple majority. This mechanism was not necessary in the 1995 election, when it could have first come into use, nor in the 1999 election, nor in the last two presidential elections, occurred in 2007 and 2011. However, it was instrumental in the selection of Néstor Kirchner in 2003.

The cabinet of ministers is appointed by the president, but is not technically part of the Executive Power. The Vice President belongs to the legislative branch, since the position also holds the presidency of the Senate.

Legislative branch

The National Congress constitutes the legislative branch of government. The Congress consists of the Senate (72 seats), presided by the Vice-President of the Nation, and the Chamber of Deputies (257 seats), currently presided by Julián Domínguez, deputy for Buenos Aires province. Senators stay in office for six years, and deputies, for four.

Each of the Provinces and the Autonomous City of Buenos Aires elect deputies and senators directly. Deputies are representatives of the whole people of the Nation, while Senators represent their districts. Each district elects a number of deputies roughly proportional to their overall population by proportional representation, and three senators: two for the majority, and one for the first minority. Members of both chambers are allowed indefinite re-elections.

Every two years, each of the 24 electoral districts (the twenty-three Provinces and the Autonomous City of Buenos Aires) elects one half of their lower chamber representatives. Districts with an odd number of Deputies elect one more or one fewer of them on each election. As for the Senators, the twenty-four districts are divided into three groups consisting of eight districts. Every two years all eight districts of one of those groups elect all their three senators, assigning two of them from the party that obtains the majority, and one from the first minority party. Six years later, the same group of districts will hold its next senatorial elections.

Current situation

Following the 9/11 mid-term elections, half the Chamber of Deputies seats and one third of the seats in the Senate were subjected to the ballot box. The Front for Victory (FPV) and other allies of Néstor and Cristina Kirchner, Argentina's progressive ruling couple, secured 113 of 257 seats in the lower house, losing 24 seats and their previous absolute majority (the fractious Justicialist Party, to which the FPV formally adheres, continue to enjoy the control of the lower house since 1989). Among Justicialists representatives, a further 17 seats went to anti-Kirchnerites (mostly conservatives), gaining just one seat from the previous situation.  The centrist social democratic Radical Civic Union, Argentina's oldest party, allied itself in various districts with the centrist Civic Coalition or with the social democratic Socialist Party, secured 77 seats, thus gaining 16. The conservative Republican Proposal secured 26 seats, gaining 12 from the previous election.  A further 24 seats went to smaller parties, mostly provincially oriented, but also from the center-left spectrum.

Something similar took place in the Senate, where the Kirchners' Front for Victory secured 36 of 72 seats (losing 4), the UCR/CC/PS grouping secured 23 (gaining 7), and the Justicialist Party wing opposed to the Kirchners maintained their presence of 9 seats.  Smaller, provincial parties were left with 4 seats in all (losing 3); Justicialists (pro or against the current Administration) maintained the control over the Senate they've enjoyed since 1983.

Riding a wave of approval during a dramatic economic recovery from a 2001-02 crisis, the Kirchners' FPV enjoyed increasingly large majorities in Congress, reaching a peak at the 2007 general elections (153 Congressmen and 44 Senators). However, soon after, on July 16, 2008, a presidentially sponsored bill to increase Argentina's export taxes on the basis of a sliding scale met with a legislative deadlock, and was ultimately defeated by the tie-breaking "against" vote of Vice President Julio Cobos. That controversial law cost the FPV 16 Congressmen and 4 Senators by way of defections.

In 2009 elections, FPV candidates lost in the four most important electoral districts (home to 60% of Argentines), only in the Province of Buenos Aires by a narrow difference. Considering the overall national vote, FPV obtained only a very narrow victory, becoming the Congress first minority from December 10, 2009, onward. This will be reflected in strengthened opposition alliances, notably the center-right Unión Pro, the center-left Civic Coalition and the left-wing Proyecto Sur, when elected candidates in both chambers take office on December 11, 2009.

Judiciary branch

The Judiciary Branch is composed of federal judges and others with different jurisdictions and of a Supreme Court with nine members (one President, one Vice President, and seven Ministers), appointed by the President with approval of the Senate, who may be deposed by Congress. As of December 2015 there are six vacancies, which then President Kirchner stated she did not intend to fill.

 President of the Supreme Court: Dr. Horacio Rosatti
 Vice-President of the Supreme Court: Dr. Carlos Rosenkrantz
 Minister of the Court: Dr. Juan Carlos Maqueda
 Minister of the Court: Dr. Ricardo Lorenzetti

Provincial and municipal governments

Argentina is divided into 23 districts called Provinces and one autonomous district, which hosts the national capital, the Autonomous City of Buenos Aires (which is conurbated into the province of Buenos Aires). Each of the provinces has its own constitution, laws, authorities, form of government, etc., though these must first and foremost comply with the national constitution and laws.

The government of each province has three branches. The Executive, Legislative and Judiciary. The Executive branch is led by a governor. The Legislative Branch may be organized as a unicameral or a bicameral system (that is, either one or two chambers or houses).

Each province, except for Buenos Aires Province, is divided into districts called departments (departamentos). Departaments are merely administrative divisions; they do not have governing structures or authorities of their own.  They are in turn divided into municipalities (cities, towns and villages). Each province has its own naming conventions and government systems for different kinds of municipalities. For example, Córdoba Province has municipios (cities) and comunas (towns); Santa Fe Province further distinguishes between first- and second- tier municipios; Chaco Province refers to every populated center as municipios, in three categories.

The Province of Buenos Aires has a different system. Its territory is divided into 134 districts called partidos, each of which usually contains several cities and towns.

Regardless of the province, each department/partido has a head town (cabecera), often though not necessarily the largest urban center, and in some provinces often named the same as their parent district.

Municipalities are ruled by mayors, usually called Intendant (intendente) in the case of cities and towns (the larger categories). A city has a legislative body called the Deliberative Council (Concejo Deliberante). The smaller towns have simpler systems, often ruled by commissions presided by a communal president (presidente communal) or a similarly named authority.

Buenos Aires city, seat of the National Government, was declared an autonomous city by the 1994 constitutional reform. Its mayor, formerly chosen by the President of the Republic, is now elected by the people, and receives the title of Chief of Government (Jefe de Gobierno). Other than that, Buenos Aires, as the provinces, has its own Legislative Branch (a unicameral Legislature) and elect deputies and senators as representatives to the National Congress.

References

External links

 
 Text of the Constitution
 Supreme Court of Justice of Argentina

 
Politics of Argentina

ast:Gobiernu y política d'Arxentina